Réjean Boivin is a Canadian retired ice hockey right wing who was an All-American for Colgate.

Career
Boivin was a star player for Colgate for four seasons. As a freshman and sophomore he finished second on the team in scoring and helped the Red Raiders climb out of the ECAC Hockey cellar. He was named team captain prior to his junior year and led the team to its best season, setting a program record for wins with 23. Unfortunately, the team was still unable to do much in the postseason and were upset in the conference quarterfinals. The Raiders regressed in Boivin's senior season but he was named an All-American for being one of the top goal-scorers in the nation, averaging one goal per game.

After graduating, Boivin spent one season playing professionally in Finland before retiring. He was inducted into Colgate's Athletic Hall of Fame in 2011.

Statistics

Regular season and playoffs

Awards and honors

References

External links

1966 births
Living people
AHCA Division I men's ice hockey All-Americans
Ässät players
Canadian ice hockey right wingers
Colgate Raiders men's ice hockey players
Ice hockey people from Quebec City
People from Sainte-Foy, Quebec City